is a 2014 Japanese youth sports film directed by Yuichi Abe.

Cast
Daisuke Watanabe as Atsushi Fushimi  
Manpei Takagi as Kido
Syuusuke Saito as Minami
James Takeshi Yamada as Kiryu
Ryusuke Nakamura as Hattori
Ken Ogasawara as Zenji
Toshihiko Tanaka as Kyoshiro
Shungo Takasaki as Mask

References

2010s Japanese films
Japanese sports films
2010s sports films